The 19th Century Spring Hill Neighborhood Thematic Resource is a multiple property submission of buildings that were listed together on the National Register of Historic Places.  It covers eight properties in the Spring Hill neighborhood of Mobile, Alabama, all built during the mid-19th century.

They represent the most intact buildings to survive from the period when Spring Hill was a summer retreat town for wealthy Mobilians seeking to escape the heat and yellow fever epidemics of the city.  Situated upon what was once the western hills outside Mobile, Spring Hill was gradually absorbed by the larger city and little remains today from its period as an independent community.

Properties

See also
National Register of Historic Places listings in Mobile, Alabama
National Register of Historic Places Multiple Property Submissions in Alabama

References

External links
 — National Register of Historic Places document.

National Register of Historic Places Multiple Property Submissions in Alabama
Antebellum architecture
National Register of Historic Places in Mobile County, Alabama